Cannero may refer to:

 Cannero Riviera, comune in the Province of Verbano-Cusio-Ossola in the Italian region Piedmont
 Castelli di Cannero, three rocky islets of Lake Maggiore in northern Italy